Letterfrack or Letterfrac is a small village in the Connemara area of County Galway, Ireland. It was founded by Quakers in the mid-19th century. Letterfrack contains the visitors centre for Connemara National Park.

History
James and Mary Ellis, a Quaker couple from Bradford in England, moved to Letterfrack, during the Great Famine. Ellis became the resident landlord in Letterfrack in 1849. As Quakers, the Ellises wanted to help with the post-famine relief effort. They built a schoolhouse, housing for tradesmen, a shop, a dispensary, and a temperance hotel. In 1857 the property was sold to John Hall, a staunch Protestant, and supporter of the Irish Church Mission to Roman Catholics. The ICM used the building with the aim of converting Catholics to Protestantism. In 1885, he established St Joseph's Industrial School, Letterfrack which opened in 1887. Like many other institutions run by the Christian Brothers, Letterfrack Industrial School has since become notorious for excessive use of corporal punishment, neglect, and child molestation of the boys in its charge, and was closed down in 1974.

Marconi wireless station
Letterfrack was selected by Marconi as the location for the transatlantic wireless receiver station for his new duplex transatlantic wireless service. It is one of the few Marconi stations still standing in the world. The duplex operation was initially developed by Marconi at Letterfrack using a balanced Carborundum detector with the aerial suspended between Diamond Hill and Mweelin. This later became standard practice for commercial and military radiotelegraph communication worldwide. 

Beginning in April 1911, eastbound messages were sent from Marconi Towers, a high power wireless station in Nova Scotia, to Letterfrack; while westbound messages were sent simultaneously from the Clifden high power wireless station to Louisbourg in 1913. The Letterfrack station was moved to Currywongaun and closed in April 1917. Some experimental work on shortwave and other work, by Marconi engineers Franklin and Witt, was carried out into the early 1920s.

St. Joseph's church 

In 1924–26 a church was built on the ground of the Industrial School after the designs of the architect Rudolf Maximilian Butler in a Romanesque Revival style. The church was dedicated to Saint Joseph by Thomas Gilmartin on 12 June 1926. The church consists of a single four-bay nave aligned north-south with two small side chapels and an attached sacristy on its western side.

Atlantic TU (GMIT) campus

In 1987 the Connemara West began running furniture courses which has become the Furniture College/Campus for the Atlantic Technological University.

Media
Connemara Community Radio broadcasts from Letterfrack.

See also
 List of towns and villages in Ireland

Further reading
 Whelan D. (ed.) Founded on Fear; Letterfrack Industrial School, war and exile by Peter Tyrrell. Irish Academic Press 2006.

References

Towns and villages in County Galway
Planned communities in the Republic of Ireland